A homewrecker is a person, object, or activity that causes the breakup of a marriage or similar relationship. Homewrecker may also refer to:

Music
 "Homewrecker", a song by Annetenna from Annetenna
 "Homewrecker", a song by Converge from Jane Doe
 "Homewrecker" (song)", a song by Gretchen Wilson from Here for the Party
 "Homewrecker", a song by hellogoodbye from Zombies! Aliens! Vampires! Dinosaurs!
 "Homewrecker!", a song by Jarvis Cocker from Further Complications
 "Homewrecker", a song by Marina and the Diamonds from Electra Heart
 "Homewrecker", one of the four archetypes depicted on the album
 "Homewrecker", a song by Nick Lowe from The Convincer
 "Homewrecker", a song by Sarge from The Glass Intact
 "Homewrecker", a song by Sisqó from Return of Dragon
 "Homewrecker", a song by Sophie Ellis-Bextor from Make a Scene
 "Homewrecker", a song by Styx from Edge of the Century
 "Homewrecker", a song by Thirsty Merc from First Work
 Homewrecker, an EP by Wires On Fire
 Homewrecker, an album by Grey DeLisle
 Homewrecker, an album by Little Hurricane

Film and television
 Homewrecker (TV series), a program on MTV
 Homewrecker (1992 film), a film featuring Kate Jackson
 Homewrecker (2009 film), a 2009 American LGBT film directed by Paul Hart
 "Homewrecker", an episode of The Closer
 "Homewrecker", an episode of The Fairly OddParents
 "Homewrecker", an episode of The Shield
 Homewreckers, a program on HGTV
 "Home Wrecker", the 18th episode of the sixth season of the FOX series American Dad!
 "Home Wreckers", the 20th episode of the fifth season of the CBS situation comedy How I Met Your Mother
 Homewrecker, the "Best of NEXT" award-winner at the 2010 Sundance Film Festival
 "Homewreckers", a bowling team featured on "Team Homer", the 12th episode of seventh season of The Simpsons
 Spider-Man: Home-Wrecker, an intentionally-revealed false title by American actor Jacob Batalon to generate publicity for the 2021 film Spider-Man: No Way Home

Cuisine
 "Home Wrecker", a sandwich featured on the menu of Hillbilly Hot Dogs
 "Homewrecker", an 8-ounce, foot-long hot dog with up to 25 toppings, featured on the 9th episode of the second season of Man v. Food